Unione Sportiva Città di Pontedera (formerly Unione Sportiva Pontedera 1912) is an Italian association football club located in Pontedera, Tuscany. Currently it plays in Serie C, the third tier of Italian football.

History
Founded in 1912, Pontedera, a team from a city in the Pisa neighbourhood, played Serie C for several years without never gaining a single promotion to Serie B. In 1993/1994, a second place in Serie C2/B allowed Pontedera to be promoted to Serie C1: during that season, the team was known for having longily been the only undefeated team in all Italian professional leagues, and for having incredibly won 2–1 to the Italy national football team coached by Arrigo Sacchi in a friendly match played in April 1994. Pontedera played Serie C1 just in 1994/1995, and relegated to Serie D in 2001, and even Eccellenza in 2002. Pontedera returned to Serie D in 2005, after having won its Eccellenza round.

In 2006 Maurizio Mian's Gunther Corporation briefly held a controlling interest in Pontedera. Pornographic film actor Ilona Staller ("Cicciolina") was installed as the club "godmother", while another pornographic actress Valentine Demy served as one of three club Presidents, alongside a Polish lap dancer named Karolcia and a British rapper named Prodigal1. The performance was related to Mian's left-libertarian views on reproductive rights and his upcoming appearance in the 2006 Italian general election.

Marcello Lippi, head coach of Italy national team and World Cup champion in the 2006 FIFA World Cup, started his professional managing career as Pontedera head coach in 1985–1986.

Serie D 2010–11
At the end of the 2010-11 Serie D season, Pontedera gained access to the Serie D play-off for promotion in Lega Pro Seconda Divisione, but they were eliminated in the third round.

Back into professionalism
In the 2012-13 Lega Pro Seconda Divisione season, Pontedera finished second in Girone B, and was promoted to Lega Pro Prima Divisione. This was the second consecutive promotion for the team. The 2013–14 season saw Pontedera topping the Lega Pro Prima Divisione table for the earlier weeks of the season, and then completing the regular season in eighth place and thus ensuring a Serie B promotion playoff spot, then losing to Lecce on penalties in the first round.

Colors and badge
Its colours are all-dark red.

Current squad
As of 1 February 2023

Out on loan

Notable former managers
Marcello Lippi

References

External links
 Official website

Football clubs in Tuscany
Association football clubs established in 1912
Serie C clubs
1912 establishments in Italy